Nick Perc (born 27 May 2003) is a Slovenian footballer who plays as a forward for Slovenian PrvaLiga side Domžale.

Career statistics

Club

References

External links
Nick Perc at NZS 

2003 births
Living people
Slovenian footballers
Slovenia youth international footballers
Slovenia under-21 international footballers
Association football forwards
Slovenian PrvaLiga players
NK Celje players
NK Domžale players